B. Sasikumar is a noted Carnatic music violinist, musician, teacher, composer and writer from Thiruvananthapuram, Kerala, India.

Profile 
B. Sasikumar was born on 27 April 1949 in Thiruvalla, to M. K. Bhaskara Panicker and G. Sarojini Amma.

He started his basic lessons in music from his father, who was a Nadaswaram maestro, musician and composer (also known as Kocchu Kuttappan of the Thiruvalla Brothers). Later he joined the Swati Thirunal College of Music, Trivandrum, Kerala, and took his Ganabhooshanam and Ganapraveena degrees in music under the guidance of violinist Chalakkudy Narayana Swamy.

He started his career as a lecturer at Swati Thirunal College of Music in 1967. He later joined All India Radio, Trivandrum, as staff artiste (Violin) in 1971 and still continues there.

Recognition and awards 

Sangeet Natak Akademi Award - 2008
Kerala Sangeetha Nataka Akademi Fellowship - 2002
Sindooram Cultural Award -1999
Trissur Youth Cultural Centre Award - 1997
Bhasha Sahitya Parishat Award - 1990
Violin Samrat Award From Kuwait-2011

References 

TM Dance Academy
Bhasabharathi

External links
Interview on Friday review - The Hindu
Sangeet Natak Academy Award announcement
1974 program of Madras Music Academy

Carnatic violinists
Recipients of the Sangeet Natak Akademi Award
1949 births
Living people
Musicians from Kerala
Malayali people
Indian classical composers
Indian male composers
People from Thiruvalla
All India Radio people
20th-century violinists
Indian violinists
20th-century Indian male classical singers
21st-century violinists
21st-century Indian male classical singers
Recipients of the Kerala Sangeetha Nataka Akademi Fellowship